The second election to Rhondda Cynon Taf County Borough Council was held on 6 May 1999.  It was preceded by the 1995 election and followed by the 2004 election. On the same day there were elections to  the other 21 local authorities in Wales and community councils in Wales and the first elections to the National Assembly for Wales were held.

Boundary Changes
An additional seat was created in the Pontyclun ward while the Rhydfelen Lower ward was abolished.

Overview
All 75 council seats were up for election. Plaid Cymru won control of the authority from Labour.

|}

Ward Results

Aberaman North (two seats)

Aberaman South (two seats)

Abercynon (two seats)

Aberdare East (two seats)

Aberdare West, Llwydcoed (three seats)

Beddau (one seat)

Brynna (one seat)

Church Village (one seat)

Cilfynydd (one seat)

Cwmbach (one seat)

Cwm Clydach (one seat)

Cymmer (two seats)

Ferndale (two seats)

Gilfach Goch (one seat)
Roberts had been elected as a Residents' candidate in 1995

Glyncoch (one seat)

Graig (one seat)

Hawthorn (one seat)

Hirwaun (one seat)

Llanharan (one seat)

Llanharry (one seat)

Llantrisant (one seat)

Llantwit Fardre (two seats)

Llwynypia (one seat)

Maerdy (one seat)

Mountain Ash East (one seat)

Mountain Ash West (two seats)

Penrhiwceiber (two seats)

Pentre (two seats)

Penygraig (two seats)

Penywaun (one seat)

Pontyclun (two seats)
An additional seat was created in this ward.

Pontypridd (one seat)

Porth (two seats)

Rhigos (one seat)

Rhondda (two seats)

Rhydfelen Central / Ilan (one seat)

Taffs Well (one seat)

Talbot Green (one seat)
Thorngate had been elected as a Labour candidate in 1995.

Tonteg (two seats)

Tonypandy (one seat)

Tonyrefail East (two seats)

Tonyrefail West (one seat)

Trallwn (one seat)

Trealaw (one seat)

Treforest (one seat)

Treherbert (two seats)

Treorchy (three seats)

Tylorstown (two seats)

Tyn-y-Nant (one seat)

Ynyshir (one seat)

Ynysybwl (one seat)

Ystrad (two seats)

References

1999 Welsh local elections
1999